Chan Ya-wen (born 2 March 1967 in Changhua, Taiwan) is a Taiwanese Hokkien pop singer, lyricist, and composer. She won the 2008 Golden Melody Award for Best Dialect Female Artist. In 2021, she was diagnosed with Parkinson's Disease, with her left hemisphere being atrophied.

Discography
1991: 是你傷我的心
1992: 用心肝飲的酒
1992: 生死戀
1992: 心の台日演歌集1
1993: 酒中情
1993: 心の台日演歌集2
1994: 孤單酒
1994: 心の台日演歌集3
1994: 心の台日演歌集4
1995: 心の台日演歌集5
1995: 心の台日演歌集6
1994: 我已經愛到你
1995: 為你心碎心痛心悶啦	
1996: 你過了好否
1997: 正確的路
1998: 一切攏是命
1998: 七夕情(歷年金選一)
1998: 放祙落彼個人(歷年金選二)
1999: 命運不是咱決定(歷年金選三)
1999: 愛你這深
2000: 人生舞台
2001: 感謝你無情
2003: 迎新春
2003: 愛你這深(歷年金選四)
2004: 想厝的人
2004: 女人夢
2005: 今年一定會好過
2006: 是你對不起我
2007: 情人保重
2007: 人生公路: Life Highway	
2008: 戀情海
2009: 底片
2011: 山伯英台
2012: 當店
2012: 感恩的花蕊
2013: 親親姊妹
2014: 北極星
2016: 何年何月再相逢

References

External links

想厝的人(詹雅雯) on YouTube
詹雅雯【人生公路】Official Music Video on YouTube
 19th Golden Melody Awards nominees
 19th Golden Melody Awards winners
19th Golden Melody Awards photographs by The Star via the Associated Press

1967 births
Living people
Taiwanese Buddhists
Taiwanese Hokkien pop singers
People from Changhua County
20th-century Taiwanese women singers
21st-century Taiwanese women singers